Darlene Mealy is an American politician who is a member of the New York City Council from the 41st district, which includes Brownsville, Bushwick, Crown Heights, East Flatbush and Prospect Lefferts Gardens in Brooklyn.

A Democrat, Mealy previously held the same seat from 2006 to 2017. In 2021, she defeated incumbent Alicka Ampry-Samuel in the Democratic primary in a major upset.

Life and career
Mealy was born in Detroit, Michigan, and attended public schools, graduating from George Wingate High School. Following high school, she attended the Borough of Manhattan Community College (BMCC) and later pursued coursework in Labor & Women’s Studies offered by Cornell University.

Prior to her election to the New York City Council, Mealy was employed at the New York City Transit Authority for 17 years, in the Department of Buses Technical Services Division.

Controversies
In 2008, Mealy was accused of attempting to funnel $25,000 in public monies to a Brooklyn block association, the Fulton-Atlantic-Ralph-Rochester Community Association (FARR), which, according to the New York Post was run by her sister. She brought controversial attention to herself in 2009 when she voted to give $5,000 of public money to Lynval Samuels (also known as Dr. Bidi XiLi Bey), for teaching "etymology". Referred to by some as a lunatic, Samuels "has been a fixture at Union St. and Utica Ave. for years, neighbors said - stopping traffic, splattering paint on parking meters and fire hydrants, and handing out flyers for his self-styled etymology classes."

Mealy was also highlighted by the press for a history of questionable housing deals she was involved in before becoming a councilwoman. In 1993, when Mealy was still with the MTA, she and her sister moved into a 3-bedroom, low-income apartment in Bushwick. These apartments were only available to families on limited incomes, specifically, those making less than $15,200 a year. Within two years, however, Mealy and her sister had purchased a $90,000 brownstone.

In September 2014, Mealy had her landlord arrested after he had changed the locks on her political offices for not paying her rent for five months. After the landlord's release from jail, he had three massive signs made that he hanged from the building’s fire escape. They declared that Mealy was a "deadbeat tenant."

New York City Council
Mealy was first elected to the 41st district of the New York City Council in 2005 after defeating William Boyland, Jr., a member of the famed Boyland political family. She was re-elected in 2009 after narrowly besting Tracy E. Boyland.

In 2010, Mealy was also elected as the Democratic District Leader for the 55th Assembly District in Brooklyn after defeating Latrice Walker, the legal counsel to Congresswoman Yvette Clarke and future assemblymember.  Mealy was re-elected to her third term on the City Council in 2013, beating her Democratic rival Kathleen Daniel 66% to 20%.

Mealy chaired the Contracts Committee and was the co-chair of the Council’s Brooklyn delegation, and a member of the Black, Latino and Asian Caucus and the Women’s Caucus.

She courted attention when she was televised tearfully casting her "yes" vote regarding Mayor Michael Bloomberg's efforts to overturn a referendum limiting him to two terms as New York City's Mayor. She had previously stated that she opposed the measure. In 2011, Mealy earned the distinction of missing the highest percentage of meetings and hearings she was supposed to have attended - 24%.

References

External links
 New York City Council website
@cmdarlenemealy (official twitter)
 "Darlene Mealy Must Go" blogsite

African-American New York City Council members
African-American women in politics
Politicians from Detroit
Politicians from Brooklyn
Living people
New York City Council members
New York (state) Democrats
Women New York City Council members
21st-century American politicians
21st-century American women politicians
Borough of Manhattan Community College alumni
21st-century African-American women
21st-century African-American politicians
1964 births